Episcepsis melanitis is a moth of the family Erebidae. It was described by Jacob Hübner in 1818. It is found in Guyana.

References

 

Euchromiina
Moths described in 1818